Shongelo is an unincorporated community in Smith County, in the U.S. state of Mississippi.

History
Shongelo was founded in the 1860s, and named after Shongelo Creek.  A post office called Shongelo was established in 1873, and remained in operation until 1921.

References

Unincorporated communities in Mississippi
Unincorporated communities in Smith County, Mississippi
Mississippi placenames of Native American origin